Michael W. Chippendale (born April 25, 1969 in Providence, Rhode Island) is an American politician and a Republican member of the Rhode Island House of Representatives representing District 40 since being elected in November 2010. Chippendale currently serves as the House Minority Leader.

Education
Chippendale attended the Community College of Rhode Island, earned his AS in mechanical engineering technology from New England Institute of Technology, and studied Business Management Johnson & Wales University.

Professional
Chippendale is the CEO and a partner of Intrepid Enterprises, LLC. Intrepid Enterprises is a real-estate management firm in Rhode Island that specializes in the rehabilitation, operation, and management of commercial and residential properties within the state of Rhode Island. Chippendale has been a Real Estate investor since 1992 and also works as a consultant on contract manufacturing jobs in the trade show exhibit, point of purchase display, and custom furniture design, engineering and manufacturing industry. Chippendale has been active in this industry since 2002.

Political career 
In 2018 Chippendale was unanimously elected by his Republican Colleagues to serve as House Minority Whip, and was unanimously reelected to that post following the 2020 election where he served with House Minority Leader and former House Minority Whip, Blake Filippi.

Chippendale currently serves on the House Committee on Oversight, the House Committee on Corporations, the House Committee on Conduct and the Permanent Joint Committee on Healthcare Oversight. Past committee assignments include the RI State Lottery Commission, Vice Chairman of House Oversight, Secretary of House Oversight, House Committee on Labor, House Committee on Environment and Natural Resources, House Judiciary Committee and the House Rules Committee.

Temporary appointments included; Chairman of the House Committee to Review and Recommend Changes to the RI Department of Health Medical Board of Licensure and Discipline in 2015, and the COVID Vaccine Task Force in December 2020.

Chippendale became House Minority Leader on June 23, 2022, following Blake Filippi announcing that he would non seek reelection to the position of House Minority Leader and immediately stepped down.

Elections
2010 To challenge District 40 incumbent Democratic Representative Scott M. Pollard, Chippendale was unopposed for the September 23, 2010 Republican Primary, winning with 409 votes and won the November 2, 2010 General election with 4,278 votes (55.3%) against Representative Pollard.
2012 Chippendale was unopposed for the September 11, 2012 Republican Primary, winning with 536 votes and won the November 6, 2012 General election with 4,065 votes (58.4%) against Democratic nominee Lauri Archambault, who had run for the seat in the 2010 Democratic Primary.
2014 Chippendale was unopposed for the September 9, 2014 Republican Primary, winning with 619 votes and won the November 4, 2014 General election with 3583 votes (68.1%) against Democratic nominee Joseph Cardillo, who had served one term as Democrat Town Councilor.
2016 There was no 2016 Republican Primary in District 40, and Chippendale won the November 8, 2016 General election with 5002 votes (69.5%) against Democratic nominee Joseph Cardillo, who had served one term as Democrat Town Councilor.
2018 There was no 2018 Republican Primary in District 40, and Chippendale won the November 6, 2018 General election with 3776 votes (61.0%) against Democratic nominee Lauren Niedel-Gresh, who was the Democratic State Committeeman, RI Delegate for Bernie Sanders in 2016, and far-left progressive activist and could not decide on what her last name was. 
2020 There was no 2020 Republican Primary in District 40, and Chippendale won the November 3, 2020 General election with 5545 votes (66.1%) against Democratic nominee Linda Nichols, a perennial candidate for multiple local offices.

References

External links
Official page at the Rhode Island General Assembly
Campaign site
Michael Chippendale at Ballotpedia
Michael W. Chippendale at the National Institute on Money in State Politics

1969 births
21st-century American politicians
Community College of Rhode Island alumni
Johnson & Wales University alumni
Living people
Republican Party members of the Rhode Island House of Representatives
People from Foster, Rhode Island
Politicians from Providence, Rhode Island